Emma Approved  is an American web series told in a vlog  format created by Bernie Su, based on the novel Emma  by Jane Austen. While the show is a follow-up to The Lizzie Bennet Diaries, it stands on its own. The series premiered on YouTube on October 7, 2013 and concluded on August 23, 2014. It starred Joanna Sotomura, Brent Bailey and Dayeanne Hutton.

Episode list

Annie Taylor

Harriet Smith

James Elton

Izzy Knightley

Maddy Bates

Caroline Lee

Bachelor Auction

Boxx Hill

Emma

Frank and Jane
These episodes take place in between previous episodes but it wasn’t until later that they were posted on YouTube, reflecting the time Emma finds out about Frank and Jane.

Back to Emma

References 

Lists of American comedy television series episodes